Frederick Nene Russell (fl. 1868–1886) was a Māori member of Parliament in New Zealand. He was one of four Māori elected in 1868 for the new Māori electorates in the New Zealand parliament.

He represented the electorate of Northern Maori from 1868 to 1870, when he retired.

He had a Pākehā father and a Māori mother and through her, he was related to Tāmati Wāka Nene.

He served as chief clerk in the Native Office at Wellington for several years, resigning in May 1884.

He died in Suva, Fiji in January 1886.

References

Members of the New Zealand House of Representatives
New Zealand MPs for Māori electorates
1886 deaths
Year of birth missing
19th-century New Zealand politicians